is a Japanese sociologist known for coining popular sociological terms like parasite singles and . A graduate of University of Tokyo, he now teaches at Tokyo Gakugei University as professor.

References
 Corresponding Japanese Wikipedia article.

1957 births
Japanese sociologists
Living people
University of Tokyo alumni